Chymotrypsinogen B2 is a protein that in humans is encoded by the CTRB2 gene.

References

Further reading